Regional hospital boards were established in 1947 by the National Health Service Act 1946 to administer hospital and specialist services of the National Health Service in England and Wales. Each board was responsible for a number of hospital management committees.

The National Health Service Reorganisation Act 1973 replaced the hospital boards with regional health authorities in 1974.

Each board administered a regional hospital area, which was defined in terms of local government units: administrative counties, county boroughs, metropolitan boroughs, urban districts and rural districts.

In 1965 a new Wessex Regional Hospital Area was formed from the western part of the South-West Metropolitan Hospital Area:

At the same time the Welsh Regional Hospital Area was redesignated as the Welsh Hospital Area, and the Regional Hospital Board became the Welsh Hospital Board.

Sources
National Health Service (Determination of Regional Hospital Areas) Order, 1946 (S.I.1946/2158)
National Health Service (Determination of Regional Hospital Areas) Amendment Order, 1958 (S.I. 1958/2093)
National Health Service (Determination of Regional Hospital Areas) Amendment Order, 1958 (S.I. 1958/2093)
National Health Service (Regional Hospital Areas) Order 1965 (S.I. 1965/527)

Defunct National Health Service organisations
Regional Health Authorities (pre-1996)